Aidan James O'Connell (born September 1, 1998) is an American football quarterback for the Purdue Boilermakers.  

O'Connell redshirted in 2017 and was the backup quarterback in 2018. As a redshirt sophomore in 2019, he started 3 games. In 2020, O'Connell started three games in place of Jack Plummer. In 2021, he was named the starter of Plummer in the third game of the season and earned second-team All-Big Ten honors. As a redshirt senior in 2022, he started 12 games and earned second-team All-Big Ten honors.

Early life and high school career
O'Connell was born in Long Grove, Illinois, on September 1, 1998. O'Connell is the middle of four brothers; his brothers are Sean, Patrick, Liam and Seamus.

O'Connell played high school football and basketball for Stevenson High School in Lincolnshire, Illinois. He was not a highly recruited Illinois high school athlete who was being offered a scholarship by Davenport University. In 2016, his only season as a starter, he threw for a school record 2,741 yards and 26 touchdowns.

College career
On February 3, 2017, O'Connell committed to play college football for Wheaton College, but less than a month later, he accepted a preferred walk-on spot with Purdue.

After not playing in 2017 and 2018, he played in six games in 2019 and started three. He made his first career start against Northwestern, completing 34 of 50 passes for 271 yards with two touchdowns and two interceptions. Overall that season, he completed 103 of 164 passes for 1,101 yards with eight touchdowns and four interceptions. O'Connell entered 2020 as the starter before suffering a season-ending injury after three games. He completed 88 of 136 passes for 916 yards with seven touchdowns and two interceptions. O'Connell entered 2021 as the backup to Jack Plummer, but eventually took over as the starter and completed 315 of 440 passes for 3,712 yards with 28 touchdowns and 11 interceptions. He decided to enter the 2023 NFL Draft after the 2022 season.

Statistics

Personal life
O'Connell is a Christian. He is married to Jael O'Connell.

References

External links
Purdue Boilermakers bio

1998 births
Living people
Players of American football from Illinois
American football quarterbacks
Purdue Boilermakers football players